The Adirondack chair is an outdoor lounge chair with wide armrests, a tall slatted back, and a seat that is higher in the front than the back. Its name references the Adirondack Mountains.

The chair was invented by Thomas Lee between 1900 and 1903 in Westport, New York, but was patented by his friend Harry C. Bunnell, who added some minor adaptations to make it more suitable for convalescents. The chairs were popularized in nearby tuberculosis sanatoria, where they were favored for the way the armrests helped open up the sitter's chest. The Lee-Bunnell chair, however, had a single plank for the chair back, and it was not until 1938 that the fan-shaped back with slats was patented by Irving Wolpin.

Adirondack chairs are now often made by injection moulding and can take any form. Since the 1980s, they have sometimes been marketed in Canada as Muskoka chairs, despite the fact that the design did not originate in Muskoka.

See also 

List of chairs

References

Chairs
American design
Adirondacks